Matthew Stephen Dunn (born 2 September 1973) is an Australian former freestyle and medley swimmer who competed in three consecutive Summer Olympics, starting in 1992.

Dunn trained at the Australian Institute of Sport under Russian swimming coach Gennadi Touretski, who also taught Alexander Popov. Dunn was a specialist in the short course (25 m) events, and won several medals in the event in the 1990s. He was a multiple Commonwealth Games gold medallist in the medley events and set a world record in the 4 × 200 m freestyle relay at the 1998 Commonwealth Games in Kuala Lumpur alongside Ian Thorpe, Michael Klim and Daniel Kowalski.

See also
 List of Commonwealth Games medallists in swimming (men)
 List of Commonwealth Games records in swimming
 World record progression 400 metres individual medley
 World record progression 4 × 200 metres freestyle relay

External links
 

1973 births
Living people
Australian male medley swimmers
People educated at Knox Grammar School
Commonwealth Games gold medallists for Australia
Swimmers at the 1992 Summer Olympics
Swimmers at the 1994 Commonwealth Games
Swimmers at the 1996 Summer Olympics
Swimmers at the 1998 Commonwealth Games
Swimmers at the 2000 Summer Olympics
Olympic swimmers of Australia
World record setters in swimming
Australian male freestyle swimmers
Australian Institute of Sport swimmers
Medalists at the FINA World Swimming Championships (25 m)
Commonwealth Games medallists in swimming
People from the Riverina
Sportsmen from New South Wales
Medallists at the 1994 Commonwealth Games
Medallists at the 1998 Commonwealth Games